Jamie Barnette is a former American and Canadian football quarterback. He played for the Montreal Alouettes of the Canadian Football League. He played college football at NC State. His first college start was against Alabama Crimson Tide football. He completed 14 out of his 25 pass attempts for a total of 260 yards. The game resulted in a close loss.

References

Living people
American football quarterbacks
Canadian football quarterbacks
NC State Wolfpack football players
Montreal Alouettes players
People from Roxboro, North Carolina
1976 births